Admiral Sir St. John Reginald Joseph Tyrwhitt, 2nd Baronet,  (18 April 1905 – 10 October 1961) was a senior Royal Navy officer who served as Second Sea Lord and Chief of Naval Personnel from 1959 to 1961.

Naval career
Born the son of Admiral of the Fleet Sir Reginald Tyrwhitt and Angela Mary Corbally, Tyrwhitt joined the Royal Navy in 1919. He served in the Second World War as Commanding Officer of the destroyer  from 1939 and then as Commander of the destroyer  from 1940 until it was sunk by Italian bombers 30 nautical miles off Crete in 1941. He was given command of the destroyer  from 1942.

After inheriting his father's baronetcy in 1951, Tyrwhitt assumed command of the cruiser  during the Korean War then became Flag Officer (Flotillas) to the Indian Navy in 1956, Chief of Staff to the Commander-in-Chief of the Mediterranean Fleet in 1958 and Second Sea Lord and Chief of Naval Personnel in 1959. He was appointed a Knight Commander of the Order of the Bath in the 1961 New Year Honours and was promoted to full Admiral on 9 September 1961. He died at Queen Alexandra Military Hospital, London, shortly after leaving office, on 10 October 1961, aged 56.

Family
In 1944, Tyrwhitt married Nancy Veronica Gilbey; they had two sons and a daughter.

References

|-

1905 births
1961 deaths
Companions of the Distinguished Service Order
Knights Commander of the Order of the Bath
Lords of the Admiralty
Recipients of the Distinguished Service Cross (United Kingdom)
Royal Navy admirals
Flag Officers Commanding Indian Fleet
Royal Navy officers of World War II
Royal Navy personnel of the Korean War